Pheng may  refer to:

Hung language 
Phong-Kniang language